Martin or Martinus was a Byzantine general of Thracian origin who served the Byzantine army during the reign of emperor Justinian I on various fronts.

He is first recorded to be active in Mesopotamia in 531 during the Iberian War. In 533 he took part in the successful Battle of Tricamarum in North Africa during the Vandalic War and remained active there until 536. From 536 to 540 he was active in Italy during the Gothic War (535–554). In 543-544 he briefly replaced Belisarius as the magister militum per Orientem, leading the disastrous invasion of Persarmenia during the Lazic War. In 544, he relieved Edessa of a Persian siege in exchange for gold. His last military activities was in 551–556 in the Caucasus during the Lazic War, including the assault on his stronghold at Telephis, his siege of Onoguris, and the Persian siege of Phasis. In 555, he had replaced Bessas as the magister militum per Armeniam.

References

Generals of Justinian I
Iberian War
Lazic War
Martin (Armeniam)
People of the Gothic War (535–554)
People of the Roman–Sasanian Wars
Roman-era Thracians
Vandalic War